This list of the Cenozoic life of Mississippi contains the various prehistoric life-forms whose fossilized remains have been reported from within the US state of Mississippi and are between 66 million and 10,000 years of age.

A

 †Abderospira
 †Abderospira aldrichi
 †Abderospira leblanci
 †Abderospira meyeri
 †Abderospira oviformis
 †Abderospira oviforms
 †Abdounia
 †Abdounia beaugei
 †Abdounia subulidens
 Abra – tentative report
 Abra – or unidentified comparable form
 Abra
 †Abra nitens
 †Abra pectorosa
 †Abra perovata
 †Acanthionella
 †Acanthionella oecioporosa
  Acanthocardia
 †Acanthocardia claibornensis
 †Acanthocardia glebosum
 Acar
 †Acar aspera
  Acirsa – tentative report
 †Acirsa solumcostata – type locality for species
 Aclis
 †Aclis matsoni – type locality for species
 †Acra
 †Acra subprotracta
  Acteocina
 †Acteocina crassiplica
 Acteon
 †Acteon annectens
 †Acteon idoneus
 †Acteon menthafons – type locality for species
 †Acteon meyeri – type locality for species
 †Acteon pomilius
 †Acteon punctatus – type locality for species
 †Acteon subaldrichi – type locality for species
 Adeonellopsis
 †Adeonellopsis cyclops
 †Adeonellopsis galeata – type locality for species
 †Adeonellopsis quisenberryae – type locality for species
 †Adeonellopsis transversa
  Aequipecten
 †Aequipecten cocoana
 †Aequipecten redwoodensis – type locality for species
 †Aequipecten spillmani
  Aetobatus
  Agaronia
 †Agaronia alabamensis
 †Agaronia media
 †Agaronia mississippiensis
 Agatrix
 †Agatrix mississippiensis
 Alaba
 †Alaba blakneyensis
 †Alaba macneili – type locality for species
 Alabina
 †Alabina menthafontis – type locality for species
 Albula
 †Albula eppsi
 Alderina
 †Alderina lunata
 †Alderina pulcherrima
 Alligator
  †Alligator mississippiensis
 †Altrix
 †Altrix altior
 †Alveinus
 †Alveinus minutus
 Americardia
 †Americardia silvacollina – type locality for species
 Ammonia
 †Ammonia beccarii
 †Amonia
 †Amonia microstriata – type locality for species
  Anadara
 †Anadara lesueuri
 †Anadara vaughani
 Ancilla
 †Ancilla staminea
 Anodontia
 †Anodontia mississippiensis
 Anomia
 †Anomia lisbonensis
 †Anomia microstriata – type locality for species
 †Anomotodon
  Antalis
 †Antalis danvillense
 †Antalis minutistriatum
 †Antalis mississippiense
 †Antalis thalloides
 Antropora
 †Antropora duplex
 †Antropora lowei – type locality for species
 †Antropora pyriforme
 †Apatemys
 †Apatemys pygmaeus – type locality for species
 Apiotoma
 †Apiotoma palmerae – type locality for species
  Aporrhais
 †Aporrhais lirata
 †Aporrhais menthafontis – type locality for species
 Arachnopusia
 †Arachnopusia vicksburgica
 †Arbia
 †Arbia aldrichi
 †Archaeomanta
 †Archaeomanta melenhorsti
  Architectonica
 †Architectonica acuta
 †Architectonica aldrichi
 †Architectonica alveatum
 †Architectonica amoena
 †Architectonica bellistriata
 †Architectonica billmoorei – type locality for species
 †Architectonica cossmanni
 †Architectonica elaborata
 †Architectonica fungina
 †Architectonica hargeri
 †Architectonica leana
 †Architectonica meekana
 †Architectonica meliconae
 †Architectonica ornata
 †Architectonica textilina
 †Architectonica trilirata
 Arcopagia
 †Arcopagia eburneopsis
 †Arcopagia raveneli
 †Arcopagia trumani
 Arcoperna
 †Arcoperna filosa
 †Arcoperna linteata – type locality for species
 Arene
 †Arene nodosa – type locality for species
 Arius
  Astarte
 †Astarte menthifontis – type locality for species
 †Astarte newtonensis
 †Astarte planilamella – type locality for species
 †Astarte triangulata
 Asthenotoma
 †Asthenotoma danvitexa
  Astrangia
 †Astrangia expansa – type locality for species
 †Astrangia harrisi
 †Astrhelia
 †Astrhelia burnsi – type locality for species
 †Astrhelia neglecta – type locality for species
  Athleta
 †Athleta lisbonensis
 †Athleta petrosa
 †Athleta symmetricus
 †Athleta triplicatus
 †Athleta tuomeyi
  Atrina
 †Atrina argentea
 †Atrina jacksoniana
  †Aturia
 †Aturia alabamensis
 †Aturia berryi
 †Aturia richardsi – type locality for species
 Atys
 †Atys caseyi – type locality for species
 †Atys pinguis – type locality for species
 †Austrocypraea
 †Austrocypraea towncreekensis – type locality for species
 Axelella
 †Axelella elongata – type locality for species

B

  Balanophyllia
 †Balanophyllia elongata – type locality for species
 †Balanophyllia haleana
 †Balanophyllia irrorata
 Balcis
 †Balcis notata
  †Baluchicardia
 †Baluchicardia greggiana
  Barbatia
 †Barbatia aspera
 †Barbatia cuculloides
 †Barbatia lima
 †Barbatia ludoviciana
 †Barbatia mississippiensis
 †Barbatia paradiagona – type locality for species
 †Barbatia seraperta
  †Basilosaurus
 †Basilosaurus cetoides
 †Bathycyathus – type locality for genus
 †Bathycyathus pulcher – type locality for species
 Bathytoma
 †Bathytoma congesta
 †Bathytoma rhomboidea – type locality for species
 Bathytormus
 †Bathytormus clarkensis
 †Bathytormus flexurus
 †Bathytormus productus
 †Bayania
 †Bayania secale
 †Belemnosella
 †Belemnosella americana
 †Belosaepia
 †Biocorbula
 †Biocorbula pearlensis
  Bison
  Bittium
 †Bittium koeneni
 †Bittium ottoi – type locality for species
 †Bonellitia
 †Bonellitia bastropensis
 †Bonellitia elevata
 †Bonellitia garvani
 †Bonellitia jacksonica
 †Bonellitia parilis
 Bornia
 †Bornia tallahalaensis – type locality for species
  Bos
 †Bovicornu
 †Bovicornu eocenense
 †Bovicornu gracile
 Brachidontes
 †Brachidontes mississippiensis
  Bregmaceros
 †Brevinucula
 †Brevinucula pseudopunctata – type locality for species
 †Bristocorbula
 †Bristocorbula fossata
 Brizalina
 †Brizalina marginata
 †Brychaetus
 †Brychaetus muelleri
 Buliminella
 †Buliminella bassendorfensis – or unidentified comparable form
 †Buliminella elegantissima
 Bulla
 †Bulla calluspira
 Bullia
 †Bullia ancillops
 †Burnhamia
 †Burnhamia daviesi
 †Burnhamia fetahi
  Busycon
 †Busycon branneri

C

 Cadulus
 †Cadulus abruptus
 †Cadulus corpulentus
 †Cadulus jacksonensis
 †Cadulus juvenis
 †Cadulus newtonensis
 †Cadulus quadriturritus
 †Cadulus vicksburgensis
 Caecum
 †Caecum alterum
 †Caecum solitarium
 Caestocorbula
 †Caestocorbula fossata
 †Caestocorbula wailesiana
 Callianassa
 †Callianassa Sp. informal
  Calliostoma
 Callista
 †Callista annexa
 †Callista goniopisthus – type locality for species
 †Callista pearlensis
 †Callista perlensis
 †Callista perovata
 †Callista sobrina
 Callopora
 †Callopora filoparietis
 †Callopora ingens
 †Callopora mundula
 †Callopora tenuirostris
 Callucina
 †Callucina choctavensis
 †Calorhadia
 †Calorhadia albirupina
 †Calorhadia aldrichiana
 †Calorhadia elongatoidea
 †Calorhadia opulenta
 †Calorhadia pharcida
 †Calorhadia reginajacksonis
 Calotrophon
 †Calotrophon ostrearum
 †Calpurna
 †Calpurna cookei – type locality for species
  Calyptraea
 †Calyptraea alta
 †Calyptraphorus
 †Calyptraphorus stamineus
 †Calyptraphorus trinodiferus
 †Calyptraphorus velatus
 Cantharus
  Capulus
 †Capulus americanus
 †Capulus langdoni – type locality for species
 †Capulus planus
  Carcharhinus
 †Carcharhinus gibbesi
  Carcharias
 †Carcharias hoperi
 †Carcharias robustus
 †Carcharias teretidens
 †Carcharias verticalis
  Carcharodon
 †Carcharodon auriculatus
 †Carditella
 †Carditella aldrichi
 †Caricella
 †Caricella demissa
 †Caricella fenestra
 †Caricella howei
 †Caricella polita
 †Caricella pyruloides
 †Caricella reticulata
 †Caricella stenzeli
 †Caricella subangulata
 †Caricella turneri
 Caryocorbula
 †Caryocorbula densata
 †Caryocorbula deusseni
 †Caryocorbula engonatoides
 †Caryocorbula willistoni
 Cassis
 †Cassis flintensis
 Cavilinga
 †Cavilinga imbricolamella – type locality for species
 †Cavilinga triloba – type locality for species
 Celleporaria
 †Celleporaria damicornis
 †Celleporaria fissurata
 †Celleporaria granulosa
 †Celleporaria peristomata – type locality for species
 Celleporina
 †Celleporina globosa
  Cerithiella
 †Cerithiella heckscheri
 †Cerithiella jacksonensis
 †Cerithiella langdoni
 †Cerithiella nassula
 †Cerithiella nassuloides – type locality for species
 †Cerithiella preconica
 †Cerithioderma
  Cervus
 Chama
 †Chama harrisi
 †Chama mississippiensis
 †Chama monroensis
 †Chama pappiladerma – type locality for species
 †Chama radiata
  Chamelea
 †Chamelea mississippiensis
  Chaoborus
  Chelonibia
 †Chelonibia melleni – type locality for species
  Chicoreus
 †Chicoreus dormani
 †Chicoreus mississippiensis
 †Chicoreus stetopus
 Chione
 †Chione craspedonta
 †Chione perbrevisformis – type locality for species
 Chionopsis
 †Chionopsis bainbridgensis
  Chiton
  Chlamys
 †Chlamys anatipes
 †Chlamys burlesonensis
 †Chlamys cainei
 †Chlamys choctavensis
 †Chlamys clarkeana
 †Chlamys cocoana
 †Chlamys danvillensis
 †Chlamys ducanensis
 †Chlamys nupera
 †Chlamys pulchricosta
 †Chlamys spillmani
 †Chlamys wahtubbeana
 †Chlamys wahtubbeanus – or unidentified comparable form
 †Choctawius – type locality for genus
 †Choctawius foxi – type locality for species
 †Cimomia
 †Cimomia subrecta
 †Cimomia vestali
 Circulus
 †Circulus ottonius
 †Circulus sotoensis
 Cirsotrema
 †Cirsotrema danvillense
 †Cirsotrema linteum
 †Cirsotrema nassulum
 †Cirsotrema newtonense
 †Cirsotrema newtonensis
 †Cirsotrema ranellinum
 †Cirsotrema spillmani
 Clathurella
 †Clathurella blakneyensis
 Clava
 †Clava menthafontis – type locality for species
 †Clava silvacollinis – type locality for species
 †Clavidrupa
 †Clavidrupa anita
  Clavilithes
 †Clavilithes columbaris
 †Clavilithes hubbardanus
 †Clavilithes humerosus
 †Clavilithes kennedyanus
 †Clavilithes longiformis
 †Clavilithes penrosei
 †Clavilithes texanus
 †Clavilithes vicksburgensis
 Clio
 †Clio simplex
 Closia
 †Closia larvata
 †Closia semen
  Clypeaster
 †Clypeaster rogersi
  Cochlespira
 †Cochlespira bella
 †Cochlespira columbaria
 †Cochlespira cookei – type locality for species
 †Cochlespira cristata - type species;  for Pleurotoma cristata.  
 †Cochlespira engonata
 †Cochlespiropsis
 †Cochlespiropsis engonata
  Codakia
 †Colpocherus – type locality for genus
 †Colpocherus mississippiensis – type locality for species
 Columbellopsis
 †Columbellopsis mississippiensis
 †Confusiscala
 †Confusiscala durhami – type locality for species
  Conger
 †Conger meridies
 †Conger vetustus
 †Congeris
 †Congeris brevior
 Conomitra – tentative report
 Conomitra
 †Conomitra crenulata
 †Conomitra hammakeri
 †Conomitra jacksonensis
 †Conomitra staminea
 †Conomitra texana
 †Conomitra vicksburgensis
 Conopeum
 †Conopeum arborescens
 †Conopeum concavum – type locality for species
 †Conopeum damicornis
 †Conopeum hookeri
 †Conopeum lacroiriir
 †Conopeum lamellosum
 †Conorbis
 †Conorbis alatoideus
 †Conorbis porcellanus
  Conus
 †Conus protractus
 †Conus sauridens
 †Conus smithvillensis
 Coralliophaga
 †Coralliophaga corrugata – type locality for species
  Coralliophila
 †Coralliophila aldrichi
 †Corbarimys
 †Corbarimys nomadus – type locality for species
  Corbula
 †Corbula alabamiensis
 †Corbula concha
 †Corbula engonata
 †Corbula extenuata
 †Corbula laqueata
 †Corbula rufaripa – type locality for species
 Cordieria
 †Cordieria biconica
 †Cordieria ludoviciana
 †Cornulina
 †Cornulina dalli
 †Cornulina minax
 †Coronia
 †Coronia alternata
 †Coronia ancilla
 †Coronia casteri
 †Coronia childreni
 †Coronia conjuncta
 †Coronia margaritosa
 †Coronia montgomeryensis
 †Coronia nodulina
 †Coronia tenella
 †Corvina
 †Corvina gemma
 †Corvina intermedia
 †Corvina pseudoradians – type locality for species
  †Coryphodon
 Costacallista – or unidentified comparable form
 †Costacallista mortoni
 †Coupatezia
 †Coupatezia woutersi
 Crassatella
 †Crassatella aquiana
 †Crassatella gabbi
 †Crassatella lirasculpta – type locality for species
 †Crassatella mississippiensis
 †Crassatella negreetensis
 †Crassatella texalta
 †Crassatella texana
 †Crassatella trapaquara
 Crassinella
 †Crassinella pygmaea
 †Crassinella pygmeae
 †Crassinella variablis – type locality for species
  Crassispira
 †Crassispira abundans
 †Crassispira lyopleura – type locality for species
 †Crassitella
 †Crassitella mississippiensis
  Crassostrea
 Crenella
 †Crenella fenestra – type locality for species
 †Crenella isocardioides
 †Crenella tenuis
 Crenilabium
 †Crenilabium altispira – type locality for species
 Crepidula
 †Crepidula dumosa
 †Crepidula lirata
 Creseis
 †Creseis corpulenta
 †Creseis simplex
 †Creseis spina
 †Cresies
 †Cresies corpulenta – or unidentified comparable form
  †Cretolamna
 †Cretolamna aschersoni
 †Cretolamna lerichei
  Crisia
 †Crisia cribraria
 †Crisia hornesi
 †Crisia lowei
  †Crommium
 †Crommium jacksonense
 †Cubitostrea
 †Cubitostrea divaricata
 †Cubitostrea lisbonensis
 †Cubitostrea perplicata
 †Cubitostrea sellaeformis
 Cuna – tentative report
 †Cuna astartoides
 †Cuneocorbula
 †Cuneocorbula subengonata
 Cuspidaria
 †Cuspidaria multiornata
 †Cyclichna
 †Cyclichna acutiscapulae – type locality for species
 †Cyclichna nida – type locality for species
 Cyclostremiscus
 †Cyclostremiscus exacuus
 †Cyclostremiscus menthafons – type locality for species
 †Cyclostremiscus quadracordata – type locality for species
 Cylichna
 †Cylichna nida – type locality for species
 Cylichnella
 †Cylichnella bitruncata
 †Cylindracanthus
 †Cylindracanthus rectus
 Cymatium
 †Cymatium vicksburgense – type locality for species
  Cymatosyrinx
 †Cymatosyrinx dorseyi
 †Cymatosyrinx palmerae
 Cymia
 †Cymia subalveata
  †Cynthiacetus – type locality for genus
 †Cynthiacetus maxwelli – type locality for species
  Cypraea
 Cypraedia
 †Cypraedia fenestralis
 †Cypraeorbis
 †Cypraeorbis nuculoides
 †Cypraeorbis sphaeroides
 †Cypraeorbis ventripotens

D

 Daphnella
 †Daphnella imperita
 †Daphnella quindecima
  Dasyatis
 †Dasyatis tricuspidatus
 †Dasyostoma
 †Dasyostoma rugostoma
  Dendrophyllia
 †Dendrophyllia lisbonensis
 Dentalium
 †Dentalium bitubatum - broadly construed
 †Dentalium incississimum
 †Dentalium jacksonense
 †Dentalium mediaviense
 †Dentalium microstria
 †Dentalium mississippiense
 †Dentalium opaculum
 †Dentalium polygonuum
 †Dentalium strenuum
 †Dentalium varicostata – type locality for species
 †Dentalium zephyrinum
 Dermomurex
 †Dermomurex cookei
 †Diacocherus
 †Diacocherus dockeryi – type locality for species
  †Diacodexis
 Diaperoecia
 †Diaperoecia clava – type locality for species
 †Diaperoecia jacksoniensis
 Dimya
 †Dimya rufaripa
  Dinocardium
 †Dinocardium vicksburgensis
  Diodon
  Diodora
 †Diodora infrequens
 †Diodora mississippiensis
 †Diodora tenebrosa
 Diplodonta
 †Diplodonta anterproductus
 †Diplodonta bulla
 †Diplodonta compacta – type locality for species
 †Diplodonta deflatus
 †Diplodonta eburnea
 †Diplodonta elatia – type locality for species
 †Diplodonta hopkinsensis
 †Diplodonta turgida
 †Diplodonta ungulina
 †Diplopholeos
 †Diplopholeos lineatum
 Discopsis
 †Discopsis pilsbryi – type locality for species
 †Discotrochus
 †Discotrochus obrignianus
 †Discotrochus orbignianus
 Distorsio
 †Distorsio crassidens
 Divalinga
 †Divalinga subrigaultiana
 †Dolicholatirus
 †Dolicholatirus cervicrassus
 †Dolicholatirus exilis
 †Dolicholatirus leaensis
 †Dolicholatirus perexilis
 Donax
 †Donax funerata
  †Dorudon

E

 †Eburneopecten
 †Eburneopecten corneoides
 †Eburneopecten frontalis
 †Eburneopecten scintillatus
 †Eburneopecten subminutus
 Echinolampas
 †Echinolampas aldrichi
  †Ectocion
 †Ectocion nanabeensis – type locality for species
 †Egertonia
 †Egertonia isodonta
 †Ekokenia
 †Ekokenia eporrecta
 Ellisina
 †Ellisina profunda
  Elphidium
 †Elphidium gavestonense
 †Elphidium latsipatium
 Emydoidea
  †Emydoidea blandingii
 Enaeta
 †Enaeta isabellae
 Endopachys
 †Endopachys londsdalei
 †Endopachys lonsdalei
 †Endopachys maclurii
 †Endopachys minutum – type locality for species
 Enoplostomella
 †Enoplostomella magniporosa – type locality for species
 †Enoplostomella synthetica
 †Eocithara
 †Eocithara jacksonensis
 †Eoclathurella
 †Eoclathurella obesula
 †Eodrilla
 †Eodrilla longsdalii
 †Eodrilla texana
 †Eodrillia – tentative report
 †Eogale – type locality for genus
 †Eogale parydros – type locality for species
 †Eophysema
 †Eophysema ozarkana
 †Eopleurotoma
 †Eopleurotoma adolescens
 †Eopleurotoma cainei
 †Eopleurotoma carya
 †Eopleurotoma cochlea
 †Eopleurotoma gemmavia
 †Eopleurotoma julia
 †Eopleurotoma lisboncola
 †Eopleurotoma nodocarinata
 †Eopleurotoma nupera
 †Eopleurotoma sayi
 †Eosurcula
 †Eosurcula moorei
 †Eosurcula pulcherrima
 †Eosurcula tuomeyi
 †Eotorpedo
 †Eotorpedo jaeckeli
 †Eotorpedo jaekeli
 Epilucina
 Epistominella
 †Epistominella pontoni
 †Epistominella vitrea
  Epitonium
 †Epitonium unilineata
 Equus
 †Equus complicatus
 †Erkosonea
 †Erkosonea semota
 †Eromotherium
 Ervilia
 †Ervilia exteroaevis – type locality for species
 †Ervilia exterolaevis – type locality for species
 †Ervilia lamelloexteria – type locality for species
 Erycina
 †Erycina zitteli
 Escharella
 †Escharella granulosa
 †Etyus
 †Etyus buccata
 †Etyus strangulata
 †Eucheilodon
 †Eucheilodon americana
 †Eucheilodon crenocarinata
 †Eucymba
 †Eucymba ocalana
 †Eucypraedia
 †Eucypraedia pittsi – type locality for species
  Eulima
 †Eulima extremis
 †Eulima jacksonensis
 Eulimella
 †Eulimella clearyensis – type locality for species
 Eumetula
 †Eumetula vicksburgella
  Eunaticina
 †Eunaticina erectiodes
  †Eunicella
 Eurytellina
 †Eurytellina linifera
 †Eurytellina mooreana
 †Eurytellina papyria
 †Eurytellina spillmani
 †Eurytellina vaughani
 †Euscalpellum
 †Euscalpellum eocenense
  Euspira
 †Euspira aldrichi
 †Euspira jacksonensis
 †Euspira marylandica
 †Euspira newtonensis
 †Euspira sabina
 †Euspira vicksburgensis
 †Exilia
 †Exilia pergracilis
 †Exochoecia
 †Exochoecia rugosa

F

 Falsifusus
 †Falsifusus bastropensis
 †Falsifusus ludlovicianus
 †Falsifusus perobliquus
 †Fedora
 †Fedora pusilla – type locality for species
 Felaniella
 †Felaniella palmerae
 †Ficopsis
 †Ficopsis penita
 †Ficopsis texana
  Ficus
 †Ficus filia
 †Ficus merita
 †Ficus mississippiensis
 Filisparsa
 †Filisparsa fallax
 Flabellum
 †Flabellum cuneiforme
 †Flabellum rhomboideum – type locality for species
 †Flabellum wailesii
 †Fleurofusia – tentative report
 Floridina
 †Floridina antiqua
 †Floridina bifoliata
 †Floridina granulosa
 †Franimys
 †Franimys actites – type locality for species
 Fulgurofusus
 †Fulgurofusus quercollis
 Fusimitra
 †Fusimitra conquisita
 †Fusimitra millingtoni
  Fusinus
 †Fusinus insectoides
 †Fusoficula
 †Fusoficula angelinensis
 †Fustaria
 †Fustaria menthifonta – type locality for species
 Fustiaria
 †Fustiaria danai
 †Fustiaria menthafonta – type locality for species
 †Fustiaria subcompressa
 †Fustilaria

G

  Galeocerdo
 †Galeocerdo clarkensis
  Galeodea
 †Galeodea brevidentata
 †Galeodea millsapsi
 †Galeodea petersoni
 †Galeodea planotecta
 †Galeodea shubutensis
 †Galeodea tricarinata
 Galeorhinus
 †Galeorhinus affini
 †Galeorhinus affinis
 †Galeorhinus huberensis
 †Galeorhinus minor
 †Galeorhinus ypresiensis
  Galeus
 Gari
 †Gari jacksonensis
 †Gari ozarkana
 †Gari papyria
 Gastrochaena
 †Gastrochaena mississippiensis
 Gegania
 †Gegania antiquata
 Gemmula
 †Gemmula amica
 †Gemmula rotaedens
 Genota
 †Genota aldrichi
 †Genota axeli
 †Genota heilprini
 Geochelone
 †Geochelone crassicutata
  †Georgiacetus
 †Georgiacetus vogtlensis
 Gephyrotes
 †Gephyrotes spectabilis – type locality for species
  †Gigantostrea
 †Gigantostrea trigonalis
 Ginglymostoma
 †Ginglymostoma subafricanum
  Globigerina
 †Globigerina praebuloides
 †Globigerina riveroae
 Globivenus
 †Globivenus ucuttana
 †Globoquadrina
 †Globoquadrina dehiscens
 Globorotalia
 †Globorotalia peripheroacuta
 †Globorotalia peripheroronda
 †Globorotalia pseudomiocenica
  Globularia
 †Globularia morgani
  Glycymeris
 †Glycymeris arctata
 †Glycymeris filosa
 †Glycymeris idonea
 †Glycymeris intercostata
 †Glycymeris lisbonensis
 †Glycymeris mississippiensis
 †Glycymeris suwannensis
 †Glycymeris wautubbeana
 Glyptemys
 †Glyptemys insculpta
 Glyptoactis
 †Glyptoactis alticostata
 †Glyptoactis complexicosta
 †Glyptoactis trapaquara
 †Glyptotoma
 †Glyptotoma conradiana
 †Glyptotoma crassiplicata
 Gonimyrtea
 †Gonimyrtea curta
 †Gracilocyon
 †Gracilocyon igniculus – type locality for species
 Graptemys
 †Gryphaeostrea
 †Gryphaeostrea plicatella

H

 Haliris
 †Haliris mississippiensis
 †Haliris quadrangularis
 Hanzawaia
 †Hanzawaia strattoni
 †Haplomylus
 †Haplomylus meridionalis – type locality for species
  Harpa
 †Harpa vicksburgiana – type locality for species
  †Harpactocarcinus
 Hastula
 †Hastula houstonia
 Haustator
 †Haustator carinata
 †Haustator perdita
 †Haustator rina
 †Haustator rivurbana
 †Heliconoides
 †Heliconoides inflata – or unidentified comparable form
  †Hemiauchenia
 †Hemiauchenia macrocephala
  Hemipristis
 †Hemipristis wyattdurhami
 †Hemisurcula
 †Hemisurcula hicoicola
 †Hemisurcula hicoricola
 †Hemisurcula perexilis
 †Hesperiturris
 †Hesperiturris nodocarinatus
 †Hesperotestudo
 †Hesperotestudo crassiscutata
  Heterodontus
 †Heterodontus sowasheense – type locality for species
 Heteropora
 †Heteropora amaena
 †Heteropora ovalis
  Hexaplex
 †Hexaplex engonatus
 †Hexaplex katherinae
 †Hexaplex marksi
 †Hexaplex silvatucus
 †Hexaplex supernus
 †Hexaplex vanuxemi
 †Hilgardia
 †Hilgardia coelatoides
 †Hilgardia multilineata
 Hincksina – tentative report
 †Hincksina ocalensis
 Hippomenella
 †Hippomenella crassicollis
 †Hippomenella punctata
 †Hippomenella radicata
 †Hippomenella rotula – type locality for species
  Hipponix
 †Hipponix – type locality for species informal
 †Hipponix n.sp informal
 †Hipponix pygmaea
 †Hipponix pygmaeus
 Hippoporina
 †Hippoporina lucens
 †Hippozeugosella
 †Hippozeugosella arcuata
 †Hippozeugosella marginata
 Homo
 †Homomya
 †Homomya hamatoides
 Hornera
 †Hornera polyporoides
  †Hyracotherium

I

 Idmonea
 †Idmonea magna
 †Idmonea milneana
 †Idmonea petri
 †Idmonea triforata
 †Infracoronia
 †Infracoronia ludoviciana
  Isurus
 †Isurus praecursor

J

 †Jaekelotodus – tentative report
 †Jefitchia
 †Jefitchia claybornensis
 Jouannetia
 †Jouannetia triquetra

K

 †Kapalmerella
 †Kapalmerella alveata
 †Kapalmerella arenicola
 Kellia
 †Kellia interstriata
 Kelliella
 †Kelliella boettgeri
 †Kelliella rufaripa – type locality for species
 †Kleidionella
 †Kleidionella grandis
  Kuphus
 †Kuphus incrassatus

L

 Lacerna
 †Lacerna jacksonensis
 †Lacinia
 †Lacinia alveata
  Laevicardium
 †Laevicardium gardnerae
 †Laevicardium leptorimum – type locality for species
  Lamna
 †Lamna lerichei
 †Lapparia
 †Lapparia dumosa
 †Lapparia exigua
 †Lapparia mooreana
  Latirus
 †Latirus aldrichi – type locality for species
 †Latirus humilior
 †Latirus indistinctus
 †Latirus mississippiensis
 †Latirus moorei
 †Latirus protractus
 †Latirus suturalis
 Leiosella
 †Leiosella orbicularia – type locality for species
 †Lepidocyclina
 †Lepidocyclina supera
  Lepisosteus
 †Lepisosteus suessionensis
 †Levifusus
 †Levifusus branneri
 †Levifusus hubbard
 †Levifusus moodianus
 †Levifusus mortonii
 †Levifusus mortoniopsis
 †Levifusus nodulatum
 †Levifusus spiniger
 Lichenopora
 †Lichenopora grignonensis
 Lima
 †Lima bastropensis
  Limacina
  Limaria
 †Limaria staminea
 Limopsis
 †Limopsis aviculoides
 †Limopsis radiata
 Linga
 †Linga pomilia
 †Lirodiscus
 †Lirodiscus jacksonensis
 †Lirodiscus pretriangulata
 †Lirodiscus protractus
 †Lirodiscus psychopterus
 †Lirodiscus smithvillensis
 †Lirofusus
 †Lirofusus thoracicus
 Lirophora
 †Lirophora victoria
 †Lithophysema
 †Lithophysema grande
 Litiopa
 †Litiopa spirata
 †Litorhadia
 †Litorhadia compsa
 †Litorhadia mater
  Lopha
 †Lopha vicksburgensis
  Lophius
 †Lophius sagittidens
 †Lophoranina
 †Lophoranina georgiana
 Lucina
 †Lucina fimbripallium – type locality for species
 †Lucina ozarkana – tentative report
 †Lucina papyracea
 †Lucina pomilia
 †Lucina subcurta
 Lucinisca
 †Lucinisca varisculpta – type locality for species
  Lunularia
 †Lunularia fenestrata
 †Lunularia jacksonensis
 †Lunularia ligulata – type locality for species
 †Lunularia tintinabula
 Lunulites
 †Lunulites bouei
 †Lunulites fenestrata
 †Lunulites jacksonensis
 †Lunulites truncata
 Lyria
 †Lyria mississippiensis
 †Lyria nestor
 †Lyrischapa
 †Lyrischapa harrisi – type locality for species
 †Lyropecten
 †Lyropecten menthifontis
 †Lyrosurcula
 †Lyrosurcula dalli
 †Lyrosurcula shaleri

M

 Macrocallista
 †Macrocallista sylvaerupis
  Mactra
 †Mactra inornata
 Madracis
 †Madracis gregoriori
 †Mammut
  †Mammut americanum
 Maretia
 †Maretia arguta – type locality for species
  Margaretta
 †Margaretta vicksburgica
 Marginella
 †Marginella constrichtoides
 †Marginella constrictoides
 †Marginella silabra
 †Mastigophora
 †Mastigophora hyndmanni
 Mathilda
 †Mathilda regularis
 †Mathilda retisculpta
 †Mazzalina
 †Mazzalina inaurata
 Mecynoecia
 †Mecynoecia semota
  †Megalonyx
 †Megalonyx jeffersonii
 Melanella
 †Melanella amnicreta
 †Melanella jacksonensis
 †Melanella postnotata
 Membraniporidra
 †Membraniporidra oecioporosa
 †Membraniporidra spissimuralis
 †Meniscopora
 †Meniscopora elliptica
 †Meridiania – type locality for genus
 †Meridiania convexa – type locality for species
 Mesalia
 †Mesalia allentonensis
 †Mesalia claibornensis
 †Mesalia vetusta
  †Metamynodon
 †Metamynodon planifrons
 †Metradolium
 †Metradolium sulciferum – type locality for species
 Metrarabdotos
 †Metrarabdotos grande – type locality for species
 †Metrarabdotos moniliferum
 Metula
 †Metula fastidiosa
 †Metula fragilis
 †Metula gentilicia
 †Metula inflata – type locality for species
 †Metula neptuneiformis – type locality for species
 †Metula subgracilis
  †Miacis
 †Michela
 †Michela trabeatoides
 †Micrdodrillia
 †Micrdodrillia vicksburgella
  Microdrillia
 †Microdrillia brevis
 †Microdrillia cossmanni
 †Microdrillia infans
 †Microdrillia ouachitae
 †Microdrillia robustula
 †Microdrillia vicksburgella
 †Microscyliorhinus – type locality for genus
 †Microscyliorhinus leggetti – type locality for species
 †Microsurcula
 †Microsurcula intacta
 †Microsurcula mentha – type locality for species
 †Microsurcula nucleola
 Miltha
 †Miltha gaufia
  †Mimoperadectes
 †Mimoperadectes sowasheensis
 Mitra
 †Mitra conquista
 †Mitra mississippiensis
 Mitrella
 †Mitrella bastropensis
 †Mitrella bucciniformis
 †Mitrella fuscicava
 †Mitrella oryzoides – or unidentified related form
 †Mitrella parva
 Mnestia
 †Mnestia meyeri
 Modiolus – tentative report
 Morum
 †Morum harpula
 Mulinia
 †Mulinia lateralis
  Murex
 †Murex angulatus
 †Murex fusates
 †Murex migus
 Murexiella
 †Murexiella vaughani – type locality for species
 †Murotriton
 †Murotriton mcglameriae
 Mustelus
 †Mustelus rodgersi
  Myliobatis
 †Myliobatis dixoni
  †Mylodon
 Myrtea
 †Myrtea curta
 †Myrtea scopularis
 †Myrtea vicksburgensis
 †Mytea
 †Mytea vicksburgensis

N

  †Nannippus
 †Nannippus minor
 †Naranius
 †Naranius americanus – type locality for species
  Nassarius
 †Nassarius albirupina
 †Nassarius exilis
 †Nassarius hilli
 †Nassarius jacksonensis
 †Nassarius macilenta
 †Nassarius mississippiensis
 †Natchitochia
 †Natchitochia jonesi
  Natica
 †Natica acuticallosa
 †Natica aperta
 †Natica caseyi
 †Natica mississippiensis
 †Natica pennunda
 †Natica permunda
  Naticarius
 †Naticarius acuticaliosa – type locality for species
 †Naticarius semilunata
  Nebrius
 †Nebrius thielensis
 Nellia
 †Nellia bifaciata
 †Nellia tenella
 Nemocardium
 †Nemocardium diversum
 †Nemocardium eocenense
 †Nemocardium harrisi
 †Nemocardium nicoletti
 †Nemocardium nicolletti
  Neverita
 Niso
 †Niso umbilicata
 Nonion
 †Nonion depressulum
 †Nonion plnatum
 Norrisia
 †Norrisia micromphala
 †Notiotitanops – type locality for genus
 †Notiotitanops mississippiensis – type locality for species
 †Nucleopsis
 †Nucleopsis subvaricata
  Nucula
 †Nucula magnifica
 †Nucula mauricensis
 †Nucula ovula
 †Nucula smithvillensis
 †Nucula sphenopsis
 †Nucula tallahalaensis – type locality for species
 †Nucula vicksburgensis
 †Nucula yazooensis
 Nuculana
 †Nuculana akidota – type locality for species
 †Nuculana linifera
 †Nuculana multilineata
 †Nuculana smithvillensis – or unidentified comparable form
 †Nuculana spheniopsis
 †Nuculana wautubbeana

O

 †Ochetosella
 †Ochetosella jacksonica
  Oculina
 †Oculina aldrichi – type locality for species
 †Oculina harrisi – type locality for species
  Odontaspis
 †Odontaspis borodini – type locality for species
 †Odontaspis hopei
 †Odontaspis hynei – type locality for species
 †Odontaspis speyeri
 †Odontaspis substriatus
 †Odontaspis winkleri
 †Odontogryphaea
  Odostomia
 †Odostomia boettgeri
 †Odostomia byramensis – type locality for species
 †Odostomia jacksonensis
 †Odostomia melanella
 †Odostomia vicksburgella – type locality for species
 †Ogivalina
 †Ogivalina elongata
 †Oligotresium
 †Oligotresium vicksburgensis
 Oliva
 †Oliva affluens
 †Oliva mississippiensis
 Oncousoecia
 †Oncousoecia quinqueseriata – type locality for species
 Onychocella
 †Onychocella celsa
  †Ophiomorpha
 †Orthosurcula
 †Orthosurcula byramensis
 †Orthosurcula langdoni
 †Orthosurcula longiforma
 Orthoyoldia
 †Orthoyoldia psammotaea
 †Orthoyoldia rubamnis
 Osthimosia
 †Osthimosia glomerata
  Ostrea
 †Ostrea brevifronta
 †Ostrea falco
 †Ostrea paroxis
 †Ostrea pulaskensis
 †Ostrea sinuosa – or unidentified comparable form
 †Ostrea westi
 Otionella
 †Otionella perforata
 †Otionella tuberosa
  †Otodus
 †Otodus angustidens
 †Otolithus
 †Otolithus americanus
 †Otolithus brevior
 †Otolithus claybornensis
 †Otolithus comes
 †Otolithus cor
 †Otolithus debilis
 †Otolithus elegantus
 †Otolithus glaber
 †Otolithus hospes
 †Otolithus insuetus
 †Otolithus laevigatus
 †Otolithus meyeri
 †Otolithus sector
 †Otolithus similis
 †Otolithus sulcatus
 †Otostomia
 †Otostomia melanella
 †Ottoina
 †Ottoina kinkelini
 †Oxyrhina
 †Oxyrhina praecursor

P

 †Pachecoa
 †Pachecoa catonis
 †Pachecoa declivis
 †Pachecoa pulchra
 †Pachygaleus
 †Pachygaleus lefevrei
 †Palaeocybium
 †Palaeocybium proosti
  †Palaeophis
 †Palaeophis casei – type locality for species
 †Palaeophis littoralis
 †Palaeophis virginianus
  †Palaeosinopa
 †Palaeosinopa aestuarium – type locality for species
 Panopea
 †Panopea bitruncata
 †Panopea oblongata
 Panthera
  †Panthera leo
 †Papillina
 †Papillina dumosa
 Paracyathus
 †Paracyathus alternatus
 †Paracyathus bellus – type locality for species
 †Paramys
 †Paramys dispar – type locality for species
 Parvilucina
 †Parvilucina posteocurta – type locality for species
 †Patulaxis
 †Patulaxis scrobiculata
 Pecten
 †Pecten byramensis
 †Pecten perplanus
 †Pecten poulsoni
  Penion
 †Penion bellus
  †Peratherium
 †Peratherium macgrewi
 †Periarchus
 †Periarchus lyelli
 Perigastrella
 †Perigastrella oscitans – type locality for species
 †Perigastrella plana
 †Perigastrella rectilineata
 Periploma
 †Periploma claibornense
 †Periploma macneili – type locality for species
 †Peristomella
 †Peristomella laticella
  Petaloconchus
 †Petaloconchus transcostatus – type locality for species
 Petrophyllia
 †Petrophyllia vicksburgensis
  Phalium
 †Phalium brevicostatum
 †Phalium johnsoni
 †Phalium menthafons – type locality for species
 †Phalium mississippiensis
 †Phalium taitii
 †Phandella
 †Phandella nepionica
 †Phandella transemma – type locality for species
 Philine
 †Philine dockeryi
 Pholadomya
  Pholas
  Phos
 †Phos jacksonense
 †Phos sagenum
 †Phos texanum
 †Phos texanus
 †Phos vicksburgensis
 Phyllodus
 †Phyllodus toliapicus
 Phyllonotus
 †Phyllonotus mississippiensis
 †Physogaleus
 †Physogaleus americanus – type locality for species
 †Physogaleus tertius
 †Pisodus
 †Pisodus oweni
  Pitar
 †Pitar aldrichi – type locality for species
 †Pitar astartiformis
 †Pitar calcanea
 †Pitar imitabilis
 †Pitar megacostata – type locality for species
 †Pitar nuttalliopsis
 †Pitar perbrevis
 †Pitar petroplitanus
 †Pitar petropolitanus
 †Pitar protena – type locality for species
 †Pitar securiformis
 †Pitar semipunctata
 †Pitar texacola
 †Pitar trigoniata
 †Plagiarca
 †Plagiarca rhomboidella
 †Plagioctenodon
 †Plagioctenodon dormaalensis
 Plagioecia
 †Plagioecia hirta
 †Platycoenia – type locality for genus
 †Platycoenia jacksonensis – type locality for species
 †Platyoptera
 †Platyoptera extenta
  Platyrhina
 †Platyrhina dockeryi – type locality for species
 Platytrochus
 †Platytrochus elegans
 †Platytrochus goldfussi
 †Platytrochus stokesi
 Plectodon
 †Plectodon intastriata
 Pleurofusia
 †Pleurofusia clarkeana
 †Pleurofusia collaris
 †Pleurofusia danvicola
 †Pleurofusia decliva
 †Pleurofusia elegantula – type locality for species
 †Pleurofusia fessa – type locality for species
 †Pleurofusia fluctuosa
 †Pleurofusia hilgardi
 †Pleurofusia hiwanneensis – type locality for species
 †Pleurofusia longirostropis
 †Pleurofusia longirostropsis
 †Pleurofusia oblivia
 †Pleurofusia servata
 †Pleuroliria
 †Pleuroliria cochlearis
 †Pleuroliria jacksonella
 †Pleuroliria subsimilis
 Pleuromeris
 †Pleuromeris inflatior
 †Pleuromeris inflator
 †Pleuromeris parva
 †Pleuromeris quadrata
 †Pleuromeris tortidens
 †Pleuronea
 †Pleuronea fenestrata
 †Pleuronea subpertusa
  †Pleurostoma
 †Pleurostoma adolescens
 †Pleurostoma rebeccae
 Pleurotoma
 †Pleurotoma cristata - original combination for Cochlespira cristata; type species for Cochlespira
 Plicatula
 †Plicatula filamentosa
 †Plicatula variplicata – type locality for species
 Pliciscala
 †Pliciscala albitesta
 †Pliciscala byramensis – type locality for species
 †Pliciscala caseyi – type locality for species
 †Pliciscala cribrum
 †Pliciscala pearlensis
  Poirieria
 †Poirieria macneili – type locality for species
  Polinices
 †Polinices aratus
 †Polinices weisbordi
 †Polyascosoecia
 †Polyascosoecia imbricata
 Polyschides
 †Polyschides margarita
 Porella
 †Porella compacta – type locality for species
 †Porella coronata
 †Porella granulosa
 †Porella irregularis
 †Porella jacksonica
 †Porella pungens
 Poromya
 †Poromya mississippiensis
  †Potamides
 †Priscoficus
 †Priscoficus juvenis
   Pristis
 †Pristis lathami
 Proboscina
 †Proboscina geminata
 †Projenneria
 †Projenneria ludoviciana
 †Protoscutella
 †Protoscutella mississippensis
 †Protoscutella mississippiensis – type locality for species
 †Protosurcula
 †Protosurcula gabbii
 †Prototomus
  Prunum
 †Prunum columba
 Pseudamussium
 †Pseudamussium corneoides
 †Pseudodontaspis
 †Pseudodontaspis lauderdalensis – type locality for species
 †Pseudodontaspis mississippiensis – type locality for species
 †Pseudofulgur – type locality for genus
 †Pseudofulgur lirata – type locality for species
 †Pseudofulgur vicksburgensis
  †Pseudolatirus
 †Pseudolatirus tortilis
 Pseudoliva
 †Pseudoliva perspectiva
 †Pseudoliva santander
 †Pseudoliva vestusta
 †Pseudoliva vetusta
 Pseudomalaxis
 †Pseudomalaxis rotella
 Pteria
 †Pteria argentea
 †Pteria limula
 †Pteria vanwinkleae
 †Pterochelus
 †Pterochelus angelus
 †Pteropsella
 †Pteropsella lapidosa
 †Pterosphenus
 †Pterosphenus schucherti
  Pterynotus
 †Pterynotus burnsii
 Puellina
 †Puellina radiata
  Puncturella
 †Puncturella jacksonensis
  Pycnodonte
 †Pycnodonte johnsoni
 †Pycnodonte trigonalis
 †Pycnodonte vicksburgensis
  Pycnodus
 †Pycnodus bowerbanki
  Pyramidella
 †Pyramidella bastropensis
 †Pyramidella crassispirata
 †Pyramidella dalli
 †Pyramidella meyeri
 †Pyramidella propeacicula
 †Pyramidella pseudopymaea
 †Pyramimitra
 †Pyramimitra quadralirata
 †Pyramimitra terebraeformis
 Pyrunculus
 †Pyrunculus laevipyrum

R

 Rangia
 †Rangia cuneata
 †Rangia johnsoni
 Raphitoma
 †Raphitoma veatchi – or unidentified comparable form
 †Rectonychocella
 †Rectonychocella tenuis
  Reteporella
 †Reteporella laciniosa
 Retusa
 †Retusa galba
 †Retusa jacksonensis
 †Retusa sylvaerupis
  Rhinobatos
  Rhinoptera
 Rhizorus – or unidentified comparable form
 †Rhizorus volutatus
  Rhynchoconger
 †Rhynchoconger sanctus
 Rictaxis
 †Rictaxis andersoni
 Ringicula
 †Ringicula biplicata
 †Ringicula crassata – type locality for species
 †Ringicula mississippiensis
 Rissoina
 †Rissoina mississippiensis

S

 †Sablea
 †Sablea minuta
 Saccella
 †Saccella catasarca
 †Saccella robusta
 †Samelina
 †Samelina pilsbryi
  Sassia
 †Sassia abbreviata
 †Sassia conradiana
 †Sassia jacksonensis
 †Sassia septemdentata
 †Saxolucina
 †Saxolucina gaufia
 Scalina
 †Scalina rubricollis
 †Scalina trapaquara
 †Scalina trigintanaria
  Scaphander
 †Scaphander hilgardi – type locality for species
 †Scaphander jacksonensis
 †Scaphander primus
 Scapharca
 †Scapharca chordicosta – type locality for species
 †Scapharca delicatula
 †Scapharca invidiosa
  Scaphella – or unidentified comparable form
 †Schizaropsis
 †Schizaropsis convexus
  Schizaster
 †Schizaster americanus
 †Schizaster armiger
 Schizomavella
 †Schizomavella longirostris – type locality for species
 †Schizopodrella
 †Schizopodrella viminea
 †Schizorthosecos
 †Schizorthosecos grandiporosus
 †Schizorthosecos interstitea
 †Schizorthosecos interstitia
 †Schyliorhinus
 †Schyliorhinus enniskilleni
 Scobinella
 †Scobinella caelata
 †Scobinella famelica
 †Scobinella ferrosilica
 †Scobinella hammettensis
 †Scobinella jacksonensis
 †Scobinella louisianae
 †Scobinella macer
 †Scobinella newtonensis
 †Scobinella pluriplicata
 †Scobinella reticulatoides
 Sconsia
 †Sconsia lintea
 †Sconsia prelintea – type locality for species
 Scrupocellaria
 †Scrupocellaria clausa
 †Scrupocellaria cookei
 †Scrupocellaria williardi
  Scyliorhinus
 †Scyliorhinus gilberti
  Seila
 †Seila constricta
 †Seila quadristriaris
 Semele
 †Semele mississippiensis
 †Semele staminea
 Semelina
 †Semelina pilsbryi
  Semicassis
 †Semicassis caelatura
 Septifer
 †Septifer probolus – type locality for species
 †Seraphs
 Serpulorbis
 †Serpulorbis squamulosus
 Sigatica
 †Sigatica boettgeri
 †Sigatica clarkeana
 †Sigatica conradii
 †Sinistrella
 †Sinistrella americana
  Sinum
 †Sinum arctatum
 †Sinum beatricae
 †Sinum bilix
 †Sinum danvillense – or unidentified comparable form
 †Sinum declive
 †Sinum inconstans
 †Sinum jacksonense – type locality for species
 †Sinum mississippiensis
 †Siphomia
 †Siphomia claibornensis
  Siphonalia
 †Siphonalia jacksonia
 †Siphonalia newtonensis
 †Siphonalia sullivani
 Siphonochelus
 †Siphonochelus curvirostratus
 †Siphonochelus gracilis
 Skena
 †Skena pignus
 Smittina
 †Smittina angulata
 †Smittina denticulifera
  Solariella
 †Solariella cancellata
 †Solariella louisiana
 †Solariella menthafontis – type locality for species
 †Solariella stalagmium
 †Solariella sylvaerupis
 †Solariella tallahalaensis – type locality for species
 †Solariella tricostata
 Solariorbis
 †Solariorbis quadrangularis
 †Solariorbis subangulatus
 †Solariorbus
 †Solariorbus subangulatus
  Solecurtus
 †Solecurtus vicksburgensis
 Solena
 †Solena abruptus
 †Solena lisbonensis
 †Sphaerocypraea
 †Sphaerocypraea jacksonensis – type locality for species
 Spheniopsis
 †Spheniopsis mississippiensis
 †Sphraena
 †Sphraena major – or unidentified comparable form
  Sphyraena – tentative report
 †Spiradaphne
 †Spiradaphne lowei
  Spisula
 †Spisula funerata
 †Spisula inaequilateralis
 †Spisula jacksonensis
 †Spisula mississippiensis
 †Spisula parilis
 †Spisula praetanius
 †Spisula praetenuis
  Spondylus
 †Spondylus dumosus
 †Spondylus filiaris
 Sportella
 †Sportella oblonga
 †Stamenocella
 †Stamenocella anatina
 †Stamenocella grandis
 †Stamenocella inferaviculifera
 †Stamenocella pyriforme
 †Steganoporella
 †Steganoporella jacksonica
 †Steganoporella rectangularia
 Sthenorytis
 †Sthenorytis witfieldi
 †Strepsidura
 †Strepsidura heilprini
 †Streptochetus
 †Streptochetus limulus
  †Striatolamia
 †Striatolamia macrota
  Strioterebrum
 †Strioterebrum tantula
 †Stromatopora
 †Stromatopora parvipora
 †Stromatopora polygonma
 Strombiformis
 †Strombiformis caseyi
  †Subhyracodon
 †Subhyracodon occidentalis
 †Sulcocypraea
 †Sulcocypraea healeyi
 †Sulcocypraea kennedyi
 †Sulcocypraea lintea
 †Sulcocypraea vaughani
 †Sullivania
 †Sullivania fisherensis
 †Sullivania hicoricola
 †Sullivania perexilis
 †Surculoma
 †Surculoma falsabenes
 †Surculoma kellogii
 †Surculoma penrosei
 †Surculoma subequalis
 Sveltella
 †Sveltella parva
 †Sveltella sotoensis
 Syntomodrillia
 †Syntomodrillia collarubra – type locality for species
 †Syntomodrillia funis – type locality for species
 †Syntomodrillia tantula
 †Syphraena

T

 †Talpavoides
 †Talpavoides dartoni
  †Teilhardina
 †Teilhardina magnoliana
 Teinostoma
 †Teinostoma caseyi
 †Teinostoma minuta – type locality for species
 †Teinostoma moodiense
 †Teinostoma neodiensa
 †Teinostoma verrilli
 Tellidorella
 †Tellidorella interlacinia – type locality for species
  Tellina
 †Tellina linifera
 †Tellina lintea
 †Tellina pearlensis
 †Tellina petropolitana
 †Tellina serica
 †Tellina subprotexta – type locality for species
 †Tellina subtriangularis
 †Tellina vicksburgensis
  Tenagodus
 †Tenagodus vitis
 †Tenegodus
 †Tenegodus vitis
 Tenuiscala
 †Tenuiscala aspersa
  Terebra
 †Terebra divisura
 †Terebra hiwanneensis – type locality for species
 †Terebra jacksonensis
 †Terebra tantula
 †Terebra texagyra
 †Terebrifusus
 †Terebrifusus multiplicatus
 Teredo
 †Teredo mississippiensis
 Terrapene
  †Terrapene carolina
 †Terrebrifusus
 †Terrebrifusus amoenus
 †Testallium
 †Testallium vetustum
 Thracia
 †Thracia vicksburgensis
 †Thracia vicksburgiana
 †Tiburnus
 †Tiburnus eboreus
 †Tiza
 †Tiza alta
 †Tornatellaea
 †Tornatellaea bella
 †Tornatellaea lata
 Tornus
 †Tornus infraplicatus
  Trachycardium
 †Trachycardium eversum
 †Trachycardium planicostata – type locality for species
 †Transovula
 †Transovula symmetrica
 †Tretocycloecia
 †Tretocycloecia grandis
 Trigonopora
 †Trigonopora grande
  Trigonostoma
 †Trigonostoma aurorae – tentative report
 †Trigonostoma babylonicum
 †Trigonostoma gemmatum
 †Trigonostoma panones
 Trigonulina
 †Trigonulina sotoensis
 †Trinacria
 †Trinacria menthifontis – type locality for species
 Triphora
 †Triphora bilineata
 †Triphora major
 †Triphora meridionalis
 †Tritaria
 †Tritaria falsus
 †Tritaria macilenta
 †Tritonatractus
 †Tritonatractus montgomeriensis
 †Tritonatractus pearlensis
 Trochita
 †Trochita aperta
 Trochocyathus
 †Trochocyathus depressus – type locality for species
 †Tropisurcula
 †Tropisurcula caseyi
 †Tropisurcula crenula – tentative report
 †Trygon
 †Trygon jaekeli
 †Trypanotoma
 †Trypanotoma longispira
 †Trypanotoma terebriformis
 Trypostega
 †Trypostega venusta
 Tubiola
 †Tubiola nautiloides
 Tudicla – or unidentified comparable form
 †Turbinolia
 †Turbinolia dickersoni – type locality for species
 †Turbinolia insignifica – type locality for species
 †Turbinolia pharetra
 †Turbinolia vicksburgensis – type locality for species
 †Turbinolia wautubbeensis – type locality for species
  Turbonilla
 †Turbonilla leafensis – type locality for species
 †Turbonilla major
 †Turbonilla mississippiensis
 Turricula
 †Turricula byramensis – type locality for species
 †Turricula longiforma
 †Turricula plenta
 †Turricula plutonica
  Turris – report made of unidentified related form or using admittedly obsolete nomenclature
 †Turris exsculpata
  Turritella
 †Turritella boycensis – type locality for species
 †Turritella carota
 †Turritella caseyi – type locality for species
 †Turritella clevelandia
 †Turritella dobyensis
 †Turritella dutexata
 †Turritella ghigna
 †Turritella gilberti
 †Turritella jacksonensis
 †Turritella mississippiensis
 †Turritella mundula – type locality for species
 †Turritella nasuta
 †Turritella planigyrata
 †Turritella premimetes – or unidentified related form
 †Turritella rubricollis – type locality for species
 †Turritella saffordi
 †Turritella tennesseensis
 †Tuscahomaophis – type locality for genus
 †Tuscahomaophis leggetti – type locality for species
 †Tuscahomys
 †Tuscahomys major
 †Tuscahomys medius
 †Tuscahomys minor
 Typhina
 †Typhina mississippiensis – type locality for species
 †Typhina palmerae
 Typhis
 †Typhis dentatus

U

 †Uintacyon
 Umbraculum
 †Umbraculum planulatum
 †Unitas
 †Unitas pearlensis
 Uromitra
 †Uromitra grantensis
 Urosalpinx
 †Urosalpinx aspinosus
 Ursus
  †Ursus americanus

V

 †Varicobela
 †Varicobela aldrichi – type locality for species
 †Varicobela smithii
 †Vassacyon
  Vasum
 †Vasum humerosum
 Venericardia
 †Venericardia apodensata
 †Venericardia bashiplata
 †Venericardia carsonensis
 †Venericardia claiboplata
 †Venericardia densata
 †Venericardia diversidentata
 †Venericardia francescae
 †Venericardia hatcheplata
 †Venericardia horatiana
 †Venericardia klimacodes
 †Venericardia mediaplata
 †Venericardia nanaplata
 †Venericardia planicosta
 †Venericardia rotunda
 Venus – report made of unidentified related form or using admittedly obsolete nomenclature
 †Venus jacksonensis
 Verticordia
 †Verticordia cossmanni
 †Verticordia dalliana
 †Verticordia quadrangularis
 †Verticordia sotoensis
 †Vetidrillia – type locality for genus
 †Vetidrillia palmerae – type locality for species
 Vexillum
 †Vexillum cellulifera
 †Vexillum cervilirata – type locality for species
 †Vexillum laevicostata – type locality for species
 †Vexillum lintoidea
 †Vexillum multiostata – type locality for species
 †Vexillum tallahalaensis – type locality for species
  Vitrinella
 †Vitrinella laevis
 †Viverravus
 †Viverravus laytoni
 †Viverriscus – type locality for genus
 †Viverriscus omnivorus – type locality for species
 †Vokesula
 †Vokesula aldrichi
 †Vokesula smithvillensis
  Volema
 †Volema hopkinsi – type locality for species
 †Volvaria
 †Volvaria reticulata
 Volvulella
 †Volvulella subspinosa – type locality for species

W

 †Wyonycteris
 †Wyonycteris primitivus – type locality for species

X

 Xancus
 †Xancus wilsoni
  Xenophora
 †Xenophora conica
 †Xenophora humilis
 †Xenophora reclusa
 †Xiphiorhynchus
 †Xiphiorhynchus eocaenicus – or unidentified comparable form
  Xylophaga – tentative report
 †Xylophaga mississippiensis

Y

 Yoldia
 †Yoldia clydoniona – type locality for species
 †Yoldia mater
 †Yoldia serica

Z

  †Zygorhiza
 †Zygorhiza kochii

References
 

Cenozoic
Mississippi
Cenozoic